Woiwurrung (sometimes spelt Woiwurrong, Woiworung, Wuywurung) and Taungurung (Taungurong, Daungwurrung Dhagung-wurrung, Thagungwurrung) are Aboriginal languages of the Kulin nation of Central Victoria. They are often portrayed as distinct languages, but they were mutually intelligible. Ngurai-illamwurrung (Ngurraiillam) may have been a clan name, a dialect, or a closely related language.

Phonology
The following is the Woiwurrung dialect:

It is not clear if the two rhotics are trill and flap, or tap and approximant. Vowels in Woiwurrung are /a e i o u/.

Pronouns
In the case of the Woiwurrung pronouns, the stem seems to be the standard ngali (you and I), but the front was suffixed to wa-, so wa+ngal combines to form wangal below. In Kulin languages there is no grammatical gender.

Other vocabulary
biik = land, country
boorondara = shade, darkness, night (origin of the name of the City of Boroondara)
nyilum biik = poor soil / hard land (origin of the name of Nillumbik Shire)
wominjeka = hello / welcome (womin = come, je [dji] = asking to come, ka = purpose)
 yabber = to talk (this word, with the same meaning, has made its way into informal English) 
yarra = flowing, (also means "hair").  It is thought to have been mistakenly given to the Yarra River (referred to as Birrarrung in the Woiwurrung language) by an early settler who asked a boy what it was called, who was confused and answered "it is flowing".

Number and sign system

A numbering system was used when Wurundjeri clans sent out messengers to advise neighbouring clans of upcoming events, such as a ceremony, corroboree, a challenge to fight or Marn grook ball game. Messengers carried a message stick with markings to indicate the number and type of people involved and a prop to indicate the type of event, such as a ball for a Marn grook event. The location of meeting was spoken, but neighbouring clans might not use the same language, so a sign language was used to indicate the number of days in the future when the people should assemble. The number was indicated by pointing to a location on the body from 1 to 16. After 16, at the top of the head, the count follows the equivalent locations across the other side of the body.

See also
Kulin nation
Wurundjeri

References

Further reading

External links

About the Wurundjeri People
Victorian Aboriginal Corporation for Languages
Elders pass on songs in race to save languages
Woiwurrung calendar

Wurundjeri
Kulin languages
Extinct languages of Victoria (Australia)